Nicholas Arthur Folland (born 17 September 1963) is a former first-class cricketer, who represented Somerset County Cricket Club between 1992 and 1994. He is now a school headmaster.

Life and career
Nick Folland studied at Loughborough University, gaining a BSc and a PGCE. After graduating, he taught young deaf people for three years before joining the staff at Blundell's School in Devon.

Folland came into county cricket unusually late; following success at Minor Counties level with Devon, he was persuaded by Somerset that he could combine his teaching with a professional cricket career and made his debut in regular first-class cricket in 1992, at the age of 28. He had played one first-class match earlier for the Minor Counties representative side against the Indian tourists in 1990.

Folland went on to play 32 first-class matches and 68 at List A level. The highlight of his career was the two first-class centuries in a match that he made in 1993 against Sussex. These turned out to be the only two first-class hundreds of his career. He left regular cricket midway through the 1994 season, deciding, according to Wisden, that "regular first-class cricket was not for him".

He was the Head of Blundell's preparatory school for ten years. He became Head of St John's on the Hill Preparatory School in Chepstow, Monmouthshire, in 2011. Since 2015 he has been Headmaster of Sherborne Prep School in Sherborne, Dorset.

His brother, Neil, taught at Haberdashers' Aske's Boys School with his Devon teammate Doug Yeabsley.

References

External links

1963 births
English cricketers
Somerset cricketers
Devon cricketers
Living people
Minor Counties cricketers
Devon cricket captains
Cricketers from Bristol
Alumni of Loughborough University
Heads of schools in England